The stela of the cactus bearer is a monolith or stele of a single piece of granite, belonging to the Chavín culture of ancient Peru, which remains in its original location on the northwest side of the circular plaza at the archaeological site known as the ceremonial center of Chavín de Huántar in the Ancash region of Peru. It was discovered during the 1972 excavation season by Peruvian archaeologist Luis Guillermo Lumbreras.

In 2001, a fragment of another stela was found in the circular plaza showing an exact mirror image of the stela of the cactus bearer. This fragment suggests that there were four stelae with this same representation: two in the northeast quadrant and two in the southeast quadrant, all facing the stairway leading to the gallery of the Lanzón de Chavín.

The importance of this stela lies mainly in the fact that it is the clearest iconographic finding regarding the ancestral and ritual use of the Echinopsis pachanoi cactus in the Andes. The presence of this entheogenic cactus in the Chavín lithic art located in one of the main structures of the ceremonial center has generated several interpretations about the function of the archaeological site.

Location 

The stela of the cactus bearer is located in its original location, that is, in the northwest quadrant inside the circular plaza at the archaeological site of Chavín de Huántar. The site is located in the district of the same name, in the province of Huari, in the Ancash region.

The circular plaza is located in front of the building called "B", Old Temple or Ancient Temple. It is semi-sunken with a depth of 2.5 meters, has two entrances (to the east and west) and has a diameter of 21 meters.

The cactus bearer's headstone was found in 1972 along with five other tombstones and it is estimated that in total there must have been 28 stelae of similar dimensions in the north and south quadrants of the west hemicycle of the plaza.

The headstones found in the northwest quadrant show anthropomorphic beings as if walking in a procession from right to left towards the east staircase, most of them carrying some object in their hands.

Below that row of 80 x 70 cm headstones is another row of rectangular headstones measuring 36 x 69 cm with representations of felines with speckles, also advancing in the same direction as the beings represented in the upper row.

Discovery and chronology

Discovery 
The headstone was part of the discovery of the circular plaza by the team led by Peruvian archaeologist Luis Guillermo Lumbreras in the 1972 campaign, on November 14, as part of the Chavín Archaeological Research Project carried out between 1966 and 1973.

In 2001, during the excavation season of Stanford University's Chavín de Huántar Archaeological Research and Conservation Program led by archaeologist John W. Rick, a fragment of another stela was found in the circular plaza that shows an exact mirror image of the northwest quadrant cactus bearer stela. This fragment shows most of the individual's left leg, a hanging serpent descending from the individual's belt, and the lower structure of the cactus stem and root.

The evidence found with the 2001 fragment suggests that the top row of headstones were also originally present in the southwest quadrant and that the slabs may have been matched pairs, totaling four stelae with the same representation: two facing right and two facing left, both facing the staircase descending westward from the Lanzón gallery.

Chronology 
The chronology of the site has been discussed throughout research for several decades. In 1989, Lumbreras placed the beginning of the Chavín culture in 1200 BC. Then, in 2001, according to archaeologist John W. Rick and his team at Stanford University, the archaeological site as a cultural center would have begun its activities around 1500-1300 BC. The latest research in 2019 by archaeologist and anthropologist Richard Burger of Yale University —based on the analysis of Accelerator Mass Spectrometry (AMS) results on bones obtained at the site— places the beginning of the occupation of Chavín de Huántar in 950 BC.

There is consensus among researchers that the ceremonial center was built over several construction sequences. Some researchers establish three phases like Burger (based on radiocarbon dating in ceramic material), others four phases and some even five like Rick. It is after the first construction phases when the circular plaza (with all its headstones), the gallery of the Caracoles, the gallery of the Offerings and the east and west access stairs were added to the existing constructions —around 750 B.C.E.—.

According to Burger's 2019 research, the construction of the circular plaza, its bas-relief headstones (including the cactus bearer stele) and associated galleries were developed in the second building phase called the Chakinani ceramic phase, from 800 to 700 B.C. This Chakinani phase is later than the first building phase called the Urabarriu ceramic phase, from 950 to 800 B.C., and earlier than the later building phase called the Janabarriu ceramic phase, from 700 to 400 B.C.

Description

Context 
The stela is located in the circular plaza of the archaeological site, east of the Ancient Temple. This is a semi-sunken plaza with a depth of 2.5 m, a diameter of 21 m and two entrances to the west and east. Of the six stelae found, five show anthropomorphic beings as if they were walking in a procession from right to left towards the east stairway. It is interpreted that they are anthropomorphized members of the priestly caste of Chavín —including musicians and dancers— that go in procession together with the jaguars (sculpted on the rectangular stelae in the lower frieze) towards the east stairway that leads to the gallery of the Lanzón, where the main stone sculptural representation of the temple is located: the Lanzón or great huanca of Chavín.

Given the location of this area in front of the Lanzón gallery located in the Ancient Temple, this structural part of the archaeological monument was called the 'Lanzón atrium'. The Lanzón atrium includes the circular plaza, the gallery of the Offerings, the gallery of the Caracoles, the east staircase (which goes from the circular plaza to the Lanzón gallery) and the west staircase.

The cactus-bearer stela is considered to be part of a group of headstones engraved and originally located in the plaza: six found in 1972 and another 22 missing, giving a total of 28 headstones (fourteen for the northwest quadrant and fourteen for the southwest quadrant of the plaza). This was calculated on the basis of the dimensions of the stelae and the hemicycle. Next to the cactus bearer stela, catalogued as headstone VI-NW12, the following stelae were found, from left to right:

 Headstone VI-NW6, in a very eroded state, but an anthropomorphic being can be distinguished in a position towards the front from which "a sort of rays appear to emanate from its four sides".
 Headstone VI-NW7 ("trumpeter", 'pututero'), next to the personage on headstone VI-NW6, represents an anthropomorphic being in profile, walking towards the western stairway (or southwest stairway) holding a conch shell or pututo with their right arm and blowing it.
 Headstone VI-NW8 ("trumpeter", 'pututero'), identical and contiguous to VI-NW7.
 Headstone VI-NW9, very eroded, a personage in profile in an attitude of walking towards the western staircase with their right arm raised carrying an object (indistinguishable).

Associated to the circular plaza and to the north side of it is the gallery of the Offerings. This gallery was initially excavated in 1966 and 1967 by Lumbreras and his team. They found more than 800 ceramic, stone, bone and shell artifacts, mostly broken. Thousands of broken bones of rodents, deer, camelids, canids, birds, fish and humans were also found. It has been interpreted that the artifacts and bones were placed as offerings in a great ritual event or great supracommunal feast.

Located on the south side of the circular plaza, the gallery of the conch shells was also discovered in 1972. At that time, a large number of large fragments of Titanostrombus galeatus (formerly Strombus galeatus) seashells and Spondylus crassisquama (formerly Spondylus princeps) shells "arranged as if forming a floor", according to Lumbreras. In 2001, in that same gallery, John Rick conducted excavations and found twenty shells (pututu in Quechua) sculpted in bas-relief.

The stela 
The stela shows an anthropomorphized being with serpent hair, a mouth with fangs, a belt with a two-headed serpent and claws, who in their right hand holds what appears to be a San Pedro cactus with four veins or striations.

Lumbreras' description of the headstone is as follows:

Identification of the cactus species 
It has been argued that the cactus depicted on the stela is the entheogenic cactus Echinopsis pachanoi, commonly called San Pedro. Apart from the bearer stela found by Lumbreras in 1972 and the stela fragment found by Rick in 2001, there are also two additional pieces found at Chavín with depictions of cacti:

 a miniature clava head recovered in 1935: three-veined cactus stems sprout from the eyes of the fanged anthropomorphic being;
 a ceramic fragment with what appears to be the corona of a four-veined cactus in a Chavín-era midden in the Wacheqsa sector, where the Mosna and Huachecza rivers meet.

From the same period known as the Early Horizon, ceramics and a textile with cactus representations have been found in the regions of Lambayeque and Ica. In sites such as Tembladera and Cupisnique in the Lambayeque region, more than 32 ceramic representations of the San Pedro cactus have been found associated with spotted felines, snakes and birds of prey.

Archaeobotanical remains of the San Pedro cactus have been found. The oldest find corresponds to that of the Guitarrero cave made by archaeologist Thomas F. Lynch in the Callejón de Huaylas, 120 km from Chavín de Huántar, dated to around 10,000 years before present. Archaeologist Rosa Fung Pineda found remains of rolled bark that she assumes from the San Pedro cactus at the archaeological site of Las Aldas on the central coast in the Ancash region, occupied in the period 1200 to 900 BC. In 2016 a group of archaeologists found this time a very well preserved cactus stem of the genus Echinopsis buried at Huaca El Paraíso in the Lima region dated to 2000 BC.

Today, the cactus is the central element in the ritual practices of northern curanderismo, an expression of traditional medicine that takes place in the northwestern part of Peru, in the regions of Cajamarca, La Libertad, Lambayeque, Piura and Tumbes, and in southern Ecuador, in the province of Loja.

Therefore, together with the evidence from ethnohistoric and ethnographic records, in addition to the presence of the cactus in the area in the wild, the researchers agree that the cactus represented on the bearer's stele is a San Pedro cactus (Echinopsis pachanoi or Echinopsis peruviana).

Interpretations 
It is commonly agreed that the different structures (buildings, plazas, stairways) of the archaeological site at Chavín de Huántar had mainly ceremonial functions and were associated with a religious cult. Thus, the site is known today as the Chavín de Huántar ceremonial center.

The circular plaza, therefore, was also a place for ritual activities. The floor of the plaza, after archaeological excavations, "has appeared remarkably clean, suggesting that it was a place cared for and maintained for singular activities." Additionally, the center of the circular plaza aligns with a structure located on a hill to the east across the Mosna River exactly with the sunrise on the summer solstice each December, suggesting that there was a reason related to astronomical observation when this sector of the archaeological monument was designed. This evidence strengthens the theory of the ritual function of the structure.

Interpretations of the use of cactus in Chavín 

The representation of entheogenic plants in the cultural material found in the archaeological site of Chavín de Huántar is solid with respect to the use of the San Pedro cactus. Other evidence also suggests the ritual use of Anadenanthera colubrina (popularly known as vilca, cebil or willka, in Quechua), due to its possible representation not only on a stela, but also due to the finding of associated paraphernalia such as snuff tablets, vilcanas and spatulas.

The use of cactus as a resource for manipulation 
Archaeologist John W. Rick argued that "in the multiple media created or used —landscape, architecture, decoration, light, sound, drugs— I find evidence of finely tuned manipulation by site planners, executors, and orchestrators." In this hypothesis, on the one hand, the representations of psychoactive plants on the stone stelae of the Chavín culture 3000 years ago are evidence of the manipulative use of entheogenic plants by cult members and, on the other hand, the Chavín temple was a place of psychological exploration and experimentation to test people's reactions to different stimuli.

From that reasoning, Rick sees Chavín as a place constructed to impress and manipulate people in order to make them part of a religious belief system that serves the construction of authority and power of the cult members in relation to the populations in the local and regional context.

The use of cacti as entheogens 
Anthropologists and archaeologists George F. Lau and Richard Burger interpreted the temple not as a center designed for manipulation, but as a center of greater complexity, proposing the site of Chavín as an important pan-Andean center of a Late Formative product exchange network —tangible and intangible— and pilgrimage. Burger also proposed that the seeds of Anadenanthera colubrina, not belonging to the ecosystems around Chavín, was one of the visionary plants that were part of this exchange, being brought to the archaeological site by pilgrims and traders from the lowland jungle.

For Burger, the use of entheogens —substances with psychotropic properties used in religious contexts— is related to shamanism:

According to this perspective, the attributes of animals such as the jaguar (Panthera onca) or the harpy eagle (Harpia harpyja) in the sculptures of the Chavín culture are related to the alter egos of South American shamans. In this sense, the presence of ceramics, metal plates, textiles and stelae such as that of the cactus bearer with attributes of felines, eagles and snakes is part of the religious message of shamanic transformation embodied in the architecture of the temple.

Interpretation of the character depicted on the stele 
The anthropomorphic being represented on the stela has, as Lumbreras describes it, serpent, eagle and feline attributes. This would be the message of shamanic transformation to which Burger refers. Likewise, given that the personage is carrying a San Pedro cactus in a ceremonial plaza, this fact accentuates the argument that "the cactus was integrated into the Chavín cult" and was used in the rituals.

Anthropologist Leonardo Feldman Gracia interpreted that the stela of the bearer carries a visual metaphorical message related to the acquisition of animal attributes by the members of the Chavín cult; in the case of the jaguar: the eyes, mouth and nose of the personage, in the case of the snakes: the hair, and in the case of the bird of prey: the claws and wings. Thus, according to Feldman Gracia, the cactus manages —by its psychotropic action— to amplify the perception and mental faculties of the person who ingests it:

Like Burger, Feldman Gracia argues that the use of the cactus must be considered under a double aspect. Not only does one acquire the attributes of animals by applying perception and mental faculties, but one also manages to enter into communion with the divinities and incarnate the mythical ancestors. The Italian anthropologist Mario Polia —according to his ethnographic research in the Sierra de Piura— sees the ritual use of the San Pedro cactus also as a sacramental drink in the context of northern curanderismo: the ingestion of the cactus is a shamanic technique that allows the union of the shaman with the spiritual entity that resides in the plant.

According to the above, then, the character engraved on the stela of the bearer would be representing a ritual specialist, a shaman, in full shamanic transformation: incorporating exceptional perceptions and faculties and, at the same time, in communion and communication with the divinities. The latter is consistent with what Mircea Eliade mentions in his book Shamanism: Archaic Techniques of Ecstasy: "To incorporate an animal during the session is, as we have seen with regard to the dead, more than a possession, a magical transformation of the shaman into that animal".

See also 

 Entheogenic drugs and the archaeological record
 Chavín culture
 Chavín de Huántar
 Lanzón

Notes

References

Bibliography 

 
 
 
 
 
 
 
 
 
 
 
 
 
 
 
 
 
 
 
 
 
 
 
 
 
 

8th-century BC steles
Chavin culture
Pre-Columbian art
Archaeological discoveries in Peru